"Take You There" is the second single from Pete Rock & CL Smooth's second album, The Main Ingredient, released in 1994. The song samples "Risin' to the Top" by Keni Burke. It features vocalist Crystal Johnson on the chorus. The B-Side is a remix of the album track "Get On The Mic" from The Main Ingredient. The song peaked at #76 on the Billboard Hot 100.

Excerpts 

Pete Rock: 

CL Smooth:

Track listing 
 Side A
1. "Take You There (featuring  Crystal Johnson)" (LP Version) (4:25)
2. "Take You There" (LP Instrumental) (4:49)
3. "Take You There" (Remix) (4:55)
4. "Take You There" (Acappella) (2:48)
 Side B
1. "Get On The Mic" (LP Version) (4:03)
2. "Get On The Mic" (Remix) (4:05)
3. "Get On The Mic" (LP Instrumental) (4:04)

References

1994 singles
Elektra Records singles
Pete Rock songs
Song recordings produced by Pete Rock
1994 songs
Songs written by Pete Rock
Songs written by CL Smooth